Stirling Gardens is a small public park in Perth, Western Australia.

Located on the corner of St Georges Terrace and Barrack Street, west of the Government House and north of the Supreme Court buildings, it contains a group of significant sculpture items.

History
Originally established by the Perth Vineyard Society in 1845 with Government approval, the Gardens were leased to Henry Laroche Cole for a ten-year period in 1846, and were eventually returned to Government control at the end of that period. In 1868 Enoch Barratt was appointed as the Government Gardener to tend Government Gardens (now known as Stirling Gardens), a position which he held until he retired in 1880.

It is one of a series of landscape features that is classified by the National Trust.

The statue of Alexander Forrest, the brother of Sir John Forrest, was constructed by Pietro Porcelli. It was first made in Guildford clay, then in plaster of Paris—sent to Italy to cast it in wax and finally in bronze. It was unveiled by Premier Walter James on 28 August 1903.  It was moved to its current location in 1916.

It has been called Stirling Square in the past, despite the coincidence of a square of the same name in Guildford.

See also
 Supreme Court Gardens, separated from Stirling Gardens by the Supreme Court buildings

References

Further reading

External links
 1959 aerial photographs looking north and east across Stirling Gardens, State Library of Western Australia

Parks in Perth, Western Australia
Barrack Street, Perth